Bob, Bobby, Robbie, Rob or Robert Fuller may refer to:

Academics
Robert W. Fuller (born 1936), American president of Oberlin College
Robert C. Fuller (born 1952), American professor of religious studies

Performers
Robert Fuller (actor) (born 1933), American TV Western star
Bob Fuller (1898—after 1935), American blues and jazz saxophonist and clarinetist
Bobby Fuller (1942–1966), American rock and roll singer and guitarist
Rob Fuller, British actor in 1991's "Miami Twice"

Sportsmen
Robert Fuller (footballer) (born 1964), Australian rules footballer
Robbie Fuller, British speedway racer in 1984 through 1988 British League season
Rob Fuller (born 1973), American Chevrolet driver at 2009 NASCAR Camping World Truck Series
Rob Fuller, English rugby lock in 2020–21's Birmingham Moseley Rugby Club

Wrestlers
Robert Fuller (wrestler) (born 1949), American wrestler and manager, birth name Robert Welch
Robert Fuller Jr. (born 1958), American wrestler, birth name Robert Gibson

Others
Robert Fuller (FBI agent), American counter-terrorism agent since 1990s
Robert E Fuller (born 1972), English wildlife artist
Robert L. Fuller (1996–2020), African American found hanged in California

See also
Robert Fuller House, American historic house in Massachusetts